Udagawa (written:  or ) is a Japanese surname. Notable people with the surname include:

Hideko Udagawa, Japanese classical violinist
, Japanese archaeologist and anthropologist
Taeko Udagawa, Japanese anthropologist 
, Japanese sumo wrestler
, Japanese scholar of Western studies

See also
4632 Udagawa, a main-belt asteroid

Japanese-language surnames